Lincoln Woods State Park is a public recreation area covering  around Olney Pond  northwest of Pawtucket in the town of Lincoln, Rhode Island. The state park is known for its giant glacial boulders and the stony nature of its terrain which prevented most of the parkland from being used as farmland or for other development.

History
Named in honor of President Abraham Lincoln, the park traces its origins to the state's purchase of Quinsnicket Pond and 71 additional acres in 1908. It had its official founding on the 100th anniversary of Abraham Lincoln’s birth, February 12, 1909. Until the 1940s, the park was popularly known as Quinsnicket, a faux Indian name commonly said to mean something like The Domain of Many Rocks. Quinsnicket was actually a name invented by white settlers, and the original Indian name for the area was Caucaunjaivatchuck.

Activities and amenities
The park offers a freshwater beach, extensive picnicking facilities, trails for equestrians, mountain bikers, snowmobilers, and hikers, boating, ice skating, and fishing areas and game fields. Canoe rentals, kayak rentals and kayaking lessons are offered by a concessionaire. The park is also known for bouldering, a type of rock climbing that does not utilize ropes or harnesses.

In popular culture
The park was a favorite haunt of the author H. P. Lovecraft, who spent summer days walking in the park and writing long letters recording vivid accounts of the park's landscape and ambiance. In 2011, part of the film Moonrise Kingdom was filmed at the park.

References

External links

 Lincoln Woods State Park Rhode Island Dept. of Environmental Management, Division of Parks & Recreation
 Lincoln Woods State Park Map Rhode Island Dept. of Environmental Management, Division of Parks & Recreation

1908 establishments in Rhode Island
Lakes of Providence County, Rhode Island
Lincoln, Rhode Island
Protected areas established in 1908
Protected areas of Providence County, Rhode Island
State parks of Rhode Island